In software development, small matter of programming (SMOP) or simple matter of programming is a phrase used to ironically indicate that a suggested feature or design change would in fact require a great deal of effort.

It points out that although the change is clearly possible, it would be very laborious to actually perform.  It often implies that the person proposing the feature underestimates its cost.

Definitions

The 1983 Jargon File describes an SMOP as follows:

The IBM Jargon Dictionary defines SMOP as:

Usage

SMOP was among the "games" described in an article  as paralleling the Games People Play identified by Dr. Eric Berne in the field of self-help psychology.  The game essentially consists of proposing seemingly simple adjustments to a design, leading to unexpected consequences and delays.

Alternative phrases such as simple matter of software or small matter of software are occasionally used in the same manner. However, the phrase is also used without irony to indicate that straightforward software development is all that is required to resolve some issue.  This usage is often invoked when the speaker wants to contrast the implied ease of software changes with the suggested greater difficulty of making a hardware change or a change to an industry standard.  This non-ironic usage is more often invoked by senior management and hardware engineers, than it is by software engineers.

The term was also explored and expanded upon by computer scientist Bonnie Nardi in her 1993 book A Small Matter of Programming: Perspectives on End User Computing.

See also

References

Computer jargon
Software project management
English-language idioms